Shaikh-ul-Mashaik Pyaromir Maheboob Khan (1887–1948) was born in Baroda, India. An Indian classical musician and younger brother of Inayat Khan, he became the representative of the International Sufi Movement on the latter's death in 1927.

Life

Their grandfather Maula Bakhsh recognized his ability in improvisation and trained him in music with Inayat. As he grew up Maheboob was exposed more to European music than Inayat had been, he conducted and took some interest in Western musical theory.

When Inayat began to travel from Baroda, he entrusted his musical students to Maheboob, but when Inayat sailed to the West in 1910 Maheboob Khan accompanied him. He settled in The Hague, marrying a Dutch disciple, Shadbiy van Goens, who bore him two children, Raheemunnisa and Mahmood. Pyaromir Maheboob Khan, his wife Shadbiy Maheboob-Khan van Goens and their daughter Raheemmunisa are buried in one grave at the Oud Eik en Duinen cemetery in The Hague.

In Europe, Maheboob learned musical composition and singing with composer and musicologist Edmond Bailly.  Maheboob had a particularly strong voice, but Maheboob, musical, intelligent, thoughtful and retiring, would rarely sing for others. There is a story that Inayat and his brother Ali Khan would sometimes pretend to go out, slamming the front door, then wait quietly in the front hall to hear Maheboob practise his singing. He composed more than 60 sacred songs. Barbara Blatherwick, the coloratura soprano, performed his songs in her recital in 1937 at the New York Town Hall. Maheboob composed a song on a sacred poem by Inayat Khan ('Before You judge.') but could not bring himself to show it to his brother who died without having heard it.

Upon the passing of Inayat Khan in 1927, Maheboob Khan took the responsibility of leading the International Sufi Movement, a post he held until his own death in 1948. He kept the Sufi message  through the difficulties of WW2 time and is remembered with love, respect and gratitude.

Music

LP recordings
Maheboob Khan. "Qawwali Asti Bulbul" (3:14) (melody by Inayat Khan) (1925) mp3
Maheboob Khan. "Qawwali Saki. Derwish Song" (3:25) (Rag Kalyan) (1925) mp3

Scores

 "Molood" - Song with music. "The Sufi" magazine (London) 1915 February	
 "Kaseeda", music and song. "The Sufi" magazine (London) 1915 May
 "Naat", music and text. "The Sufi" magazine (London) 1915 September
 "Kawwali", Song, text and music. "The Sufi" magazine (London) 1915 November
 "Ishk me tere Kohegam". Song, with P. F. accompaniment, by Maheboob Khan. (Maḣbūb Khān). London: Indian Art & Dramatic Society, 1916
 "Kaseeda, Ganga Gumni", text and scores. "The Sufi" magazine (London) 1916 April
 "Gazal I Hafiz" (Words by Inayat Khan). "The Sufi" magazine (London) 1916 November
 "Masnavi" (Words by Jalaluddin Rumi). "The Sufi" magazine (London) 1917 May
 "The Wine Divine" (Words by Inayat Khan). "The Sufi" magazine (London) 1917 October
 Maheboob Khan - Hindustani songs. Words by Pir'o Murshid Inayad. French words by François de Bretevil. II. Hindou song to the soul of the saint - Genève : Henn, PN A. 521 H., cop. 1924. - 3 S. Kl. Randschaden. gering gebräunt. Texte in Hindi/Französisch/Englisch.
 Maheboob Khan - Hindustani Songs / Words by Pir'o Murshid Inayad ; French words by François de Breteuil. Genève : Edition Henn ; London ... : [s.n.] ; New York ... : [s.n.], 1924. Nr. 1: Bhajan Hindou (Hindou Love Song) — Nr. 2: Hindou Song to the soul of the saint — Nr. 3: Bibhas Hindou — Song to the Sun.
 "Jahanara Begam: en indisk kejsardotter". Butenschøn, Andrea Publication 1927 209 s. pl. mus. (Indian raga in European notation Maheboob Khan and by Nils Larsen). 
Songs of Maheboob Khan -  1. Before you judge 2. Thy wish 3. You are my life 4. Every breath in thy thought 5. Turn me not away 6. Kalyan. Lyrics words from the book  'Gayan, Vadan, Nirtan' by Inayat Khan; music by Maheboob Khan.- Rotterdam : Faiz, PN 1374, cop. 1932.
 Songs by Shaikh-ul-Mashaik Pyaromir Maheboob Khan. 13 original songs for Voice and Piano. Hague, East-West Publications Fonds, 1988

CD recordings

 "Sufi songs". Songs composed by Maheboob Khan based on words of Inayat Khan. Ute Döring, mezzo-soprano, and J. van Lohuizen, piano. Recorded and  мanufactured in Germany by: CES in 1998
 "The Sun of Love". Symphonic compositions by Inayat Khan, Maheboob Khan and Hidayat Inayat Khan. Novosibirsk String Quintet. Recorded and  manufactured in Russia by SufiMovement.ru in 2004.

Articles
Spirituality - the Tuning of the Heart by Shaikh-ul-Mashaikh Maheboob Khan. "Toward the One" Volume four. USA. Spring 2003 pp. 66–68

Sources
Inayat Khan by Ronald A. L. Mumtaz Armstrong. Geneva, The Sufi Publishing Association, 1927
The Sufi Message and The Sufi Movement by Inayat Khan. 1964 Barrie and Rockliff. London pp. 10
Hazrat Inayat Khan a Brief Sketch of His Life and Teaching L. Hayat Bouman. The Hague, East-West Publications Fonds, 1982
 Musharaff Moulamia Khan. Pages in the life of a Sufi, Den Haag - East West Publications, 1982. 155pp.. . Third Edition

References

External links
Maheboob Khan (1887-1948) "Song of the Dawn"

1887 births
1948 deaths
Hindustani instrumentalists
Indian Sufis
People from Vadodara
Performers of Sufi music
Ināyati Sufis
20th-century Indian musicians